Shyamaprasanna Bhattacharyya  was an Indian politician. He was elected to the Lok Sabha, the lower house of the Parliament of India from the Uluberia in West Bengal as a member of the Communist Party of India (Marxist).

References

External links
Official biographical sketch in Parliament of India website

1905 births
Communist Party of India (Marxist) politicians
India MPs 1971–1977
India MPs 1977–1979
Lok Sabha members from West Bengal
People from Howrah district
Year of death missing